Wizard of the Vibes is a Blue Note Records compilation of performances by jazz vibraphonist Milt Jackson.  The sessions were the work of The Thelonious Monk Quintet (the July 2, 1948 and July 23, 1951 sessions) and The Modern Jazz Quartet plus Lou Donaldson (a 1952 session).  The album has been recompiled and expanded three additional times, with various tracks from these sessions added and deleted.

The tracks from the Modern Jazz Quartet plus Lou Donaldson consisted of John Lewis on piano, Percy Heath on bass, Kenny Clarke on drums, Milt Jackson on vibraphone, and Lou Donaldson on alto saxophone. The tracks with the Thelonious Monk Quintet were Thelonious Monk on piano, John Simmons on bass, Shadow Wilson on drums, and Milt Jackson on vibraphone—with Kenny "Pancho" Hagood singing on the tracks "All the Things You Are" and "I Should Care".

The original 1952 10" LP was expanded  to a 12" LP in 1956, and retitled Milt Jackson and the Thelonious Monk Quintet with a cover designed by Reid Miles, his first for the label.  In 1989, the cover and title of the 1956 version were used for a CD featuring the complete 1948 and 1952 sessions, but the 1951 Monk Session was moved to Monk's Genius of Modern Music: Volume 2.  The 2001 album Milt Jackson: Wizard of the Vibes used the cover art and title of the original 1952 album, but contained a re-ordered and remastered version of the contents of the 1989 CD.

In each formulation, the album contained Blue Note Thelonious Monk-led performances unavailable on the parallel editions of Genius of Modern Music.

Reception
The Penguin Guide to Jazz described the tracks with Monk as "classics, rising to their greatest height with the riveting version of "I Mean You"." The AllMusic reviewer wrote that "Jackson's inventive playing throughout both dates makes this an important CD in his considerable discography, so it should be a part of any bop fan's collection."

Track listings

Milt Jackson, Wizard of the Vibes (Blue Note LP 5011, 10", 1952)
Side 1:
"Tahiti"	
"Lillie"	
"Criss-Cross"
"Willow Weep for Me"
Side 2:	
"What's New?"
"Bags' Groove"	
"On the Scene"	
"Eronel"

Tracks A3, A4, B4 recorded July 23, 1951.
Tracks A1-A2, B1-B3 recorded April 7, 1952.

Milt Jackson and The Thelonious Monk Quintet (Blue Note BLP-1509, 12", 1956)
Side 1:
"Lillie"	
"Tahiti"	
"What's New?"	
"Bags' Groove"	
"On the Scene"	
"Willow Weep for Me"
Side 2:	
"Criss Cross"
"Eronel"	
"Misterioso" (alternate master)	
"Evidence"	
"Lillie" (alternate master)
"Four in One" (alternate master)
Tracks B3, B4 recorded July 2, 1948.
Tracks A6, B1, B2, B6 recorded July 23, 1951.
Tracks A1-A5, B5 recorded April 7, 1952.

Milt Jackson and the Thelonious Monk Quintet (1989 CD, uses 1956 red cover)
"Tahiti"
"Lillie"
"Lillie"
"Bags' Groove"
"What's New?"
"What's New?"
"Don't Get Around Much Anymore"
"Don't Get Around Much Anymore"
"On the Scene"
"Evidence"
"Misterioso"
"Misterioso"
"Epistrophy"
"I Mean You"
"All the Things You Are"
"I Should Care"
"I Should Care"

10-17 recorded July 2, 1948
1-9 recorded April 7, 1952.

Milt Jackson, Wizard of the Vibes (2001 CD, uses 1952 cover)
"Tahiti"	
"Lillie"	
"Bags' Groove"	
"What's New"
"Don't Get Around Much Anymore"	
"On The Scene"	
"Lillie" (alternate take)
"What's New" (alternate take)	
"Don't Get Around Much Anymore" (alternate take)
"Evidence"
"Misterioso" 	
"Epistrophy" 	
"I Mean You"
"Misterioso" (alternate take) 	
"All The Things You Are"
"I Should Care"
"I Should Care" (alternate take)

10-17 recorded July 2, 1948
1-9 recorded April 7, 1952.

See also

References 

1952 albums
Milt Jackson albums
Blue Note Records albums
Albums with cover art by Reid Miles